Homie may refer to:
Homie (band), a project of Rivers Cuomo
Homies (musical group), South Korean hip hop group
Homies (toy), a series of small toy figurines
"Homies" (song), 2002 song by Insane Clown Posse
HOMIE (rapper), Belarusian singer, songwriter, rap and hip-hop artist

See also

Homeboy (disambiguation)
Homey (disambiguation)
"Homegirl", a song by King Princess from the album Cheap Queen
Homer Simpson, a character in The Simpsons